The Peace Palace is an international law administrative building in The Hague, the Netherlands. It houses the International Court of Justice (which is the principal judicial body of the United Nations), the Permanent Court of Arbitration (PCA), The Hague Academy of International Law and the Peace Palace Library.

The palace officially opened on 28 August 1913; it was originally built to provide a home for the PCA, a court created to end war by the Hague Convention of 1899. Andrew Dickson White, whose efforts were instrumental in creating the court, secured from Scottish-American steel magnate Andrew Carnegie US$1.5 million ($, adjusted for inflation) to build the Peace Palace. The European Heritage Label was awarded to the Peace Palace on 8 April 2014.

History

Background
In 1908, Thomas Hayton Mawson won a competition to design the grounds. Because of budget constraints, he also had to discard design elements: mountains and sculptures. He made use of a natural watercourse on the site.

Conception

The idea of the palace started from a discussion in 1900 between the Russian diplomat Friedrich Martens and American diplomat White over providing a home for the Permanent Court of Arbitration (PCA). White contacted Andrew Carnegie. Carnegie had reservations, and at first was only interested in donating money for the establishment of a library of international law. White, however, was able to convince Carnegie, and in 1903 Carnegie agreed to donate the US$1.5 million ($, adjusted for inflation) needed to house the court as well as to endow it with a library of international law. White described his idea to Carnegie:

"A temple of peace where the doors are open, in contrast to the Janus-temple, in times of peace and closed in cases of war [...] as a worthy testimony of the people that, after many long centuries finally a court that has thrown open its doors for the peaceful settlement of differences between peoples".
  
Were such a fabric to be created, men would make pilgrimages from all parts of the civilized world to see it.  It would become a sort of holy place, prized and revered by thinking men throughout the world, and to which, in any danger of war between any two countries, the minds of men would turn naturally and normally. The main difficulty now is that the people of the various nations do not really know what was done for them by the Conference; but such a building would make them know it.  It would be an "outward and visible sign" of the Court, which would make its actual, tangible existence known to the ends of the earth"
—Andrew Dickson White to Andrew Carnegie, 5 August 1902

At first Carnegie simply wanted to donate the money directly to the Dutch Queen Wilhelmina of the Netherlands for the building of the palace, but legal problems prohibited this, and in November 1903 the Carnegie Stichting was founded to manage the construction, ownership, and maintenance of the palace. This foundation is still responsible for these issues.

Construction

To find a suitable design, the foundation called for an open international competition. The winning design, set in the Neo-Renaissance style, was submitted by French architect Louis M. Cordonnier. To build within budget, Cordonnier and his Dutch associate J.A.G. van der Steur adjusted the design. The palace initially had two big bell towers in front and two small ones in the back. Only one big tower and one small tower remained in the final building. Also to save money, the separate library building from the winning design was incorporated into the palace itself.

The palace is filled with many gifts of the different nations who attended the Second Hague Conference as a sign of their support. Among the gifts are a  vase from Russia, doors from Belgium, marble from Italy, a fountain from Denmark, wall carpets from Japan, the clock for the clock tower from Switzerland, Persian rugs from Persia, wood from Indonesia, Brazil and the United States of America and wrought-iron fences from Germany.

In 1907, the first stone was symbolically placed during the Second Hague Conference. The construction began some months later and was completed with an inauguration ceremony on 28 August 1913, attended by Andrew Carnegie, among others. At the ceremony, Carnegie predicted that the end of war was "as certain to come, and come soon, as day follows night." The year was 1913.

In 2007, Queen Beatrix opened the new building for the Peace Palace Library of International Law, housing the entire catalogue of the library, a lecture hall and a new reading room in the bridge to the main building of the Peace Palace. A Visitors Centre was added to the Peace Palace in 2012, which is also designed by Michael Wilford.

In 2002, an eternal peace flame was installed in front of its gates.

Occupants
The Peace Palace has accommodated a variety of organisations:

 Permanent Court of Arbitration (1913–present) The original occupant for which the Peace Palace was constructed. From 1901 until the opening of the palace in 1913, the Permanent Court of Arbitration was housed at Prinsegracht 71 in The Hague.
 Permanent Court of International Justice (1922–1946) and its successor the International Court of Justice (1946–present). In 1922 the Permanent Court of International Justice of the League of Nations was added to the occupants. This meant the library was forced to move to an annex building, and the Permanent Court of Arbitration was moved to the front left of the building. In 1946, when the United Nations replaced the League of Nations, the International Court of Justice was established as the UN's principal judicial organ.
 Peace Palace Library of International Law (1913–present). Being the original vision of Carnegie, the library grew quickly to house the best collection of material on international law. Although this stature is well in the past, the library still contains some original classical works, as the original copies of Hugo Grotius' works on peace and law and Erasmus' Querela Pacis.
 The Carnegie Stichting (1913–present)
 The Hague Academy of International Law (1923–present). Established in 1914, strongly advocated by Tobias Michael Carel Asser. Funds for the academy came from another peace project by Andrew Carnegie, namely the Carnegie Endowment for International Peace, established in 1910.

Other international courts in The Hague, the Iran–United States Claims Tribunal, the International Criminal Tribunal for the former Yugoslavia, and the International Criminal Court, are separate organizations, located elsewhere in The Hague.

Interior

The palace also features a number of statues, busts and portraits of prominent peace campaigners from around the world and of all eras.

See also
 Central Organization for Durable Peace

References

Further reading

External links

 Official website
 Peace Palace Library
 Website for Projects connected with the 100 year anniversary of the Peace Palace
 The ICJ in the Service of Peace and Justice, Conference organised on the Occasion of the Centenary of the Peace Palace, 23 September 2013

Andrew Carnegie
Buildings and structures completed in 1913
Buildings and structures in The Hague
Courthouses in the Netherlands
Diplomatic buildings
Gardens by Thomas Hayton Mawson
The Hague Academy of International Law
International Court of Justice
Permanent Court of Arbitration
Rijksmonuments in The Hague
Tourist attractions in South Holland
1913 establishments in the Netherlands
Palaces in the Netherlands